J. James was an Indian politician and former Member of the Legislative Assembly. He was elected to the Tamil Nadu legislative assembly as an Indian National Congress candidate from Thiruvattar constituency in 1967 election and as an Indian National Congress (Organisation) candidate in 1971 election and as a Janata Party candidate 1977 election.

References 

People from Kanyakumari district
Indian National Congress politicians from Tamil Nadu
Living people
Year of birth missing (living people)
Indian National Congress (Organisation) politicians
Janata Party politicians